Susan Ellen Anton is an American actress and singer.

Early life 
Anton attended Yucaipa High School in Yucaipa, California, and graduated in 1968. After high school, Anton attended San Bernardino Valley College. She first experienced fame by winning the nearby Miss Redlands and later the Miss California beauty contests in 1969 and tied as second runner-up in the 1969 Miss America Scholarship Pageant held September 6 that year.

Career 
Starting in 1976, Anton developed a following for her Muriel Cigar commercials where she sang, "Let Muriel turn you on / That is my desire / Muriel lights a flame in me / Where there's Muriel smoke, there's fire". Later in the 1970s, Anton appeared approximately 30 times on Merv Griffin's TV show. She was frequently seen and heard in television, print and radio ads for the Perfect Sleeper mattress by Serta. In these ads, she announced her name and sang the company's jingle.

In 1978, ABC gave her and country singer Mel Tillis a summertime variety series, Mel and Susan Together, produced by the Osmond Brothers. The pairing of Anton and Tillis was an unlikely one: he was popular in country music circles but hardly a national household name while Susan was barely known at all. The show disappeared after four weeks; nevertheless, she was later chosen as one of Time Magazines "Most Promising Faces of 1979". 

She later starred in her own variety show, Presenting Susan Anton, Stop Susan Williams (one of three serials in the Cliffhangers series), and in the films Goldengirl, Spring Fever, and Cannonball Run II. She also recorded music, her biggest hit being "Killin' Time" in 1980, a duet with country singer Fred Knoblock. The record made Top 10 on the country charts and hit #28 on Billboard's Hot 100. In 1990, Anton appeared on the TV comedy series Night Court in an episode called "The Talk Show" where she played talk show producer Margo Hunter.

Anton is on the cover of the mass trade paperback edition of Goldengirl, written by Peter Lovesey (using the pen name Peter Lear). She had appeared as the title character in the film version which starred James Coburn and was directed by Joseph Sargent.

Anton was the host of the successful "Great Radio City Music Hall Spectacular" show at the Flamingo Hilton in Las Vegas for over 5,000 performances until July 31, 2000. She also appeared in the Las Vegas company of the musical Hairspray and on Broadway in The Will Rogers Follies, Hurlyburly, and All Shook Up.

She had a recurring role on the TV series Baywatch from 1992 to 1994 and has appeared as herself on Queer Eye for the Straight Guy (2006), The Larry Sanders Show (1993) and It's Garry Shandling's Show (1987), as well as in several films. Most recently she appeared in the movie Sharknado: The 4th Awakens in 2016.

Anton appeared in an episode of Law & Order: Special Victims Unit which aired on March 31, 2010.

She was scheduled to reprise her role as Velma Von Tussle in Hairspray at the Hollywood Bowl production slated to run from August 5 to 7, 2011.

In 2020, Anton starred in the feature psychological thriller film Painter as the character Carree Tole.

Personal life 
 
Anton was involved in a much-publicized relationship with English film and TV star Dudley Moore in the early 1980s, with much being made of their height difference: Moore being  and Anton . Anton married television actor Jeff Lester on August 15, 1992, her second marriage.

Filmography

Discography

References

External links 

20th-century American actresses
21st-century American actresses
Living people
Actresses from California
American women country singers
American country singer-songwriters
American film actresses
American musical theatre actresses
American stage actresses
American television actresses
American women pop singers
American beauty pageant winners
Miss America 1970 delegates
People from San Bernardino County, California
Singer-songwriters from California
21st-century American women singers
San Bernardino Valley College alumni
Country musicians from California
People from Yucaipa, California
20th-century American singers
Year of birth missing (living people)